Quinella is the tenth album by American Southern rock band Atlanta Rhythm Section, and their only album on Columbia Records, released in August 1981. The band was supposed to release another album on the label, but due to differences between Columbia and the band, the album was shelved.

The album peaked at #70 on the Billboard 200. Its only single, "Alien", peaked at #29 on the Billboard Hot 100, becoming their final Top 40 hit.

Track listing

Personnel

Atlanta Rhythm Section
 Barry Bailey - guitar
 J.R. Cobb - guitar
 Dean Daughtry - keyboards
 Paul Goddard - bass guitar
 Ronnie Hammond - acoustic guitar, percussion, vocals, backing vocals
 Roy Yeager - percussion, drums

Additional musicians
 Buddy Buie - backing vocals
 Steve McRay - piano and backing vocals on "Alien"
 Mark Denning - synthesizer

Production
 Producer: Buddy Buie
 Associate producer: Rodney Mills
 Engineers: Rodney Mills, Greg Quesnel
 Associate engineer: Greg Quesnel
 Mastering: Bob Ludwig
 Art direction: Mike McCarty
 Design: Mike McCarty

Charts
Album

Singles

References

External links

1981 albums
Albums produced by Buddy Buie
Atlanta Rhythm Section albums
Columbia Records albums